The 32nd Light Dragoons was a cavalry regiment of the British Army. It was raised in October 1794, by Colonel Henry Joseph Blake. It was disbanded shortly afterwards on 26 February 1796.

References

Cavalry regiments of the British Army
Dragoon regiments of the British Army
Dragoons
Light Dragoons